Tail fat is the fat of some breeds of sheep, especially of fat-tailed sheep. It is fat accumulated in baggy deposits in the hind parts of a sheep on both sides of its tail and on the first 3–5 vertebrae of the tail. These hind parts are used to accumulate fat for subsequent use during dry seasons, similar to a camel's humps.

It is known under the name kurdyuk in Russian and in Central Asian languages, from the proto-Turkic *kudruk 'tail'.

Tail fat is known in Arabic as لية, (leeyeh,  leyyah, or layeh), zaaka in Algeria,  kuyruk yağı 'tail fat' in Turkish, and دنبه [donbe or dombe] in Iran, אַלְיָה (Alya) in Hebrew, words which may be found in ancient texts as well as in local food culture and in sheep breeds' names.

The rendered tail fat does not solidify at room temperature and is used in cuisine. Crackling left after the rendering or frying of kurdyuk may be used as an appetizer. When being rendered, kurdyuk emits a strong odour, described as "acidy-poisonous". However, it has a rich flavor when ready to eat. In particular it is used to cook kofta, pilav, and other traditional dishes.

References

Meat
Sheep
Animal fat products
Cooking fats